Widzino  (German Veddin) is a village in the administrative district of Gmina Kobylnica, within Słupsk County, Pomeranian Voivodeship, in northern Poland.

The village has a population of 535.

References

Widzino